is a Japanese convention center outside Tokyo, located in the Mihama-ku ward of Chiba City, in the northwest corner of Chiba Prefecture. Designed by Fumihiko Maki, it is accessible by Tokyo's commuter rail system. Makuhari is the name of the area, and Messe is a German language word meaning "trade fair".

The convention center opened on October 9, 1989. It hosts many high-technology events.

Makuhari Messe is close to Tokyo Disney Resort in Urayasu, and to Chiba prefecture's black sand beaches. It is accessible from Kaihimmakuhari station on the Keiyō Line of East Japan Railway Company (JR East). The center is the host of the annual Tokyo Auto Salon (modified car show, in January), the biennial Tokyo Motor Show (in October), the annual Tokyo Game Show (video game hardware and software exhibition, in September), the annual Jump Festa (manga, anime, and video game exposition, in December), and the biannual Wonder Festival (toys, scale figures, and garage kits exposition, in February and July). The venue was host to several Nintendo Space World events.

It was the venue for certain sports during the Tokyo 2020 Olympic and Paralympic Games.

Notable events

On June 14 and 15, 1997, the first official Pokémon Trading Card Game tournament was held here.

On July 31, 1999, rock band Glay held their first Glay Expo concert, titled Glay Expo '99 Survival, at the venue. The concert garnered a total audience of about 200,000 people, making it the largest concert ever held by a single act in Japan, as certified by the Guinness World Records.

Since 2000, the center has been used for the Summer Sonic music festival every year, where the venue hosts the Mountain and Sonic stages.

On November 2 and 3, 2002, Red Hot Chili Peppers hosted a gig as part of the By the way album tour.

On April 23 and 24, 2011, Australian singer Kylie Minogue performed as part of her Aphrodite: Les Folies Tour.

The venue was noted in 2005 for hosting the first round of the Live8 concert.

On 1 July 2005, the company that owns the convention center changed its name from "Nippon Convention Center" to "Makuhari Messe".

On July 19 to 21, 2008, Lucasfilm presented a Star Wars Celebration Japan event at the venue to celebrate the 30th anniversary of the Japanese premiere of Star Wars.

The "Jack in the Box 2009 Summer" convention was held here on August 15, 2009, where numerous well-known acts performed, including the reunion performance of influential metal band Dead End.

American pop singer Lady Gaga performed in the arena for the first time, as part of her debut headlining tour, The Fame Ball Tour, during the Summer Sonic Festival, on August 8, 2009 and for MTV Video Music Aid Japan in 2011.

The center also hosted the Magic: The Gathering World Championship in 2010.

It was scheduled to host the Anime Contents Expo, hosted by the Comic-10 Shakai in March 2011 to counter the Tokyo International Anime Fair as part of their boycott of the Tokyo Metropolitan Government under Governor Shintarō Ishihara, but both events were cancelled after the 2011 Tōhoku earthquake and tsunami. The first Anime Contents Expo was held on March 31 and on April 1, 2012, and was visited by 42,000 people.

The Japanese band The Gazette held various concerts there, including their 10th-anniversary concert on March 10, 2012.

The heavy metal annual festival tour Ozzfest took place here on May 11–12, 2013. This was the festival's first appearance in Japan.

Kawaii metal band Babymetal has played a number of concerts here including the Legend 1997 show on 12/21/2013 for singer Su-metal's 16th birthday, which was recorded for live DVD.  On their 2015 world tour, they would again play here and release the performance on live DVD as part of the Trilogy: Metal Resistance Episode III – Apocalypse limited edition DVD set available only to members of "The One".

One Direction's Final Leg of their Take Me Home Tour was held in the International Exhibition Halls 7 and 8.

Mariah Carey performed in the arena for the first time, as part of her The Elusive Chanteuse Show on October 4, 2014.

The Metal festival "Knotfest Japan" was held here on 15 and 16 November 2014.

As an epilogue to their 25th anniversary, Luna Sea hosted the rock festival Lunatic Fest on June 27 and 28, 2015. Other acts include Siam Shade, Dir en grey, 9mm Parabellum Bullet and Fear, and Loathing in Las Vegas the first night and Glay, Mucc and Alexandros the second.

Techno-Pop group Perfume performed at concerts June 16, 18, and 19, 2016.

It has been the venue of Magical Mirai, an annual Vocaloid exhibition and concert held usually during the end of August or early September, featuring Hatsune Miku since 2016.

On December 2 and 3, 2017, the trance-pop duo fripSide performed at the venue for their “crossroads 2017-2018 tour”. In 2017 and 2018, it held the obstacle course show Kunoichi.

Ariana Grande played 3 shows at the arena for her 2017 Dangerous Woman Tour performing to over 52,000 people.

Makuhari Messe became the venue for four sports during the Tokyo 2020 Olympics. The sports of fencing, taekwondo, karate, and wrestling were originally to be staged at Tokyo Big Sight. This move was a part of cost-cutting measures implemented by the organisers. Karate has since been moved to the Nippon Budokan.  Assigned halls for the Games are:
 Hall A: For the Olympic Games, taekwondo and wrestling; then for the Paralympic Games, sitting volleyball; 
 Hall B: For the Olympic Games, fencing; then for the Paralympic Games, taekwondo and wheelchair fencing; 
 Hall C: For the Paralympic Games, goalball.

Gallery

References

External links

 Makuhari Messe website 
 Makuhari Messe Map

Basketball venues in Japan
Venues of the 2020 Summer Olympics
Olympic wrestling venues
Olympic fencing venues
Olympic taekwondo venues
Convention centers in Japan
Fumihiko Maki buildings
Indoor arenas in Japan
Modernist architecture in Japan
Music venues in Japan
Sports venues in Chiba (city)
Tourist attractions in Chiba Prefecture
Judo venues
Music venues completed in 1989
Sports venues completed in 1989
1989 establishments in Japan